Tom Adams (born c. 1933) was a Canadian football end who played for the Ottawa Rough Riders of the Canadian Football League. He was selected in the 17th round of the 1956 NFL Draft by the Chicago Bears with the 202nd overall pick, but never played for the Bears.

References 

1930s births
Living people
American football ends
Canadian football ends
UCLA Bruins football players
Ottawa Rough Riders players
Chicago Bears players
American players of Canadian football